Breton Woods is an unincorporated community located within Brick Township, in Ocean County, New Jersey, United States. The community is located near the Metedeconk River and is bisected by Mantoloking Road (County Route 528). Except for commercial businesses located along Mantoloking Road, the area is made up of bungalows dotting the small roads throughout the area.

History
Breton Woods was established in the 1930s when property developers laid out a community of summer homes. A post office was established at Breton Woods in 1937, and remained in operation until it was discontinued in 1960.

References

Brick Township, New Jersey
Unincorporated communities in Ocean County, New Jersey
Unincorporated communities in New Jersey